Sheet metal embossing is a stamping process for producing raised or sunken designs or relief in sheet metal. This process can be made by means of matched male and female roller dies, or by passing sheet or a strip of metal between rolls of the desired pattern. It is often combined with foil stamping to create a shiny, 3D effect.

Process
The metal sheet embossing operation is commonly accomplished with a combination of heat and pressure on the sheet metal, depending on what type of embossing is required.  Theoretically, with any of these procedures, the metal thickness is changed in its composition.

Metal sheet is drawn through the male and female roller dies, producing a pattern or design on the metal sheet. Depending on the roller dies used, different patterns can be produced on the metal sheet.  The pressure and a combination of heat actually "irons" while raising the level of the image higher than the substrate to make it smooth.  The term "impressing" refers to an image lowered into the surface of a material, in distinction to an image raised out of the surface of a material.

In most of the pressure embossing operation machines, the upper roll blocks are stationary, while the bottom roll blocks are movable. The pressure with which the bottom roll is raised is referred to as the tonnage capacity.

Embossing machines are generally sized to give  of strip clearance on each side of an engraved embossing roll. Many embossing machines are custom-manufactured, so there are no industry-standard widths.

Characteristics
The metal embossing manufacturing process has these characteristics:

 The ability to form ductile metals.
 Use in medium to high production runs.
 The ability to maintain the same metal thickness before and after embossing.
 The ability to produce unlimited patterns, depending on the roll dies.
 The ability to reproduce the product with no variation.

Commonly used materials 
The following materials are suitable for embossing:

 Aluminium (all alloys)
 Aluminium (T1/T2)
 Brass
 Card stock
 Cold rolled steel
 Copper
 Galvanized steel
 High strength, low alloy, steel
 Hot rolled steel
 Steel (all alloys)
 Zinc

See also 

 Diamond plate
 Repoussé and chasing

External links
 
 Video

Metal forming